Uhry (previous name – Uhertsi) is a village (selo) in Lviv Raion, Lviv Oblast (province) of Western Ukraine. It belongs to Horodok urban hromada, one of the hromadas of Ukraine. The village covers an area of 2,17 km2 and the population is around 1134 people.

Geography 

History 
Uhry was probably founded in the fifteenth century; records first mention it in 1427. The village has been of the Polish family Nezabytovsky until First World War. The Nezabytovski family were held in high esteem and respect for among the local population.

Until 18 July 2020, Uhry belonged to Horodok Raion. The raion was abolished in July 2020 as part of the administrative reform of Ukraine, which reduced the number of raions of Lviv Oblast to seven. The area of Horodok Raion was merged into Lviv Raion.

Cult constructions and religion 
In the village there are two churches:
 Church of St. Paraskeva.
 Roman Catholic Church - Chapel Nezabytovskyh 1902.

Gallery

References

External links 
 Słownik geograficzny Królestwa Polskiego i innych krajów słowiańskich, Tom XII, S 752 
 village Uhry
 weather.in.ua

Literature 
  Page 261.

Villages in Lviv Raion